Bradley Williams may refer to:
 Bradley Williams (cricketer)
 Bradley Williams (footballer)

See also
 Brad Williams (disambiguation)